Ralph Mauriello (born August 25, 1934) is a retired American professional baseball pitcher who appeared in three games in Major League Baseball for the Los Angeles Dodgers in . Born in Brooklyn, where he was a Dodger fan, he moved with his family to Los Angeles when he was 14, graduated from North Hollywood High School, and was offered a baseball scholarship by the University of Southern California's legendary coach, Rod Dedeaux. His baseball career would touch both his native and adopted cities: signed by the Brooklyn Dodgers in 1952, he would make his only appearances for the parent team six years later, at the end of their first season in Los Angeles.

He climbed the ladder in the Dodger organization, winning 18 games (and losing eight) for the 1955 Mobile Bears of the Double-A Southern Association. His 1958 call-up came after a minor-league year split between Double-A and Triple-A. In his MLB debut September 13, a starting assignment against the Pittsburgh Pirates at Forbes Field, he lasted only one-third of an inning; of the five batters he faced, three made hits and a fourth took a base on balls. Charged with three earned runs, he was tagged with the Dodgers' eventual 9–4 defeat. But, six days later, he started against the Chicago Cubs at Wrigley Field, permitted only one run on five hits, and racked up his first MLB victory, 5–1. Eight days later, at the Los Angeles Memorial Coliseum, he came in against the Cubs as a middle reliever in the third inning of a 1–1 deadlock. Mauriello allowed only one hit through three innings, as the Dodgers built a 4–1 lead. But in the sixth frame, he gave up a two-run homer to Bobby Thomson, and exited the game with the Dodgers still ahead, 4–3. The Los Angeles bullpen could not hold the advantage, though: Chicago rallied in the ninth inning to win 7–4 in what would be Mauriello's final big-league game.

Mauriello retired from baseball after the 1960 season, his eighth in the Dodger system. He earned his undergraduate degree from USC in electrical engineering in 1961, then a master's from UCLA in computer design, and built a successful career in the computer industry.

As a major leaguer, he split two decisions, and allowed six earned runs on ten hits and eight bases on balls in 11 innings pitched, with 11 strikeouts and a 4.63 earned run average.

References

External links

1934 births
Living people
American people of Italian descent
Asheville Tourists players
Baseball players from New York (state)
Businesspeople from Los Angeles
Fort Worth Cats players
Los Angeles Angels (minor league) players
Los Angeles Dodgers players
Major League Baseball pitchers
Mobile Bears players
Montreal Royals players
Newport News Dodgers players
Pueblo Dodgers players
St. Paul Saints (AA) players
Santa Barbara Dodgers players
Spokane Indians players
Sportspeople from Brooklyn
Baseball players from New York City
University of California, Los Angeles alumni
University of Southern California alumni
Victoria Rosebuds players
North Hollywood High School alumni